The 42nd Field Artillery Regiment (Lanark and Renfrew Scottish), RCA is a Canadian Army Reserve artillery regiment based in Pembroke, Ontario. It is part of the 4th Canadian Division's 33 Canadian Brigade Group.

It was initially converted from the The Lanark and Renfrew Scottish Regiment to artillery in 1946.
It includes the 35th Field Battery, RCA.

Lineage
Originated 5 October 1866 in Brockville, Ontario, as the 42nd "Brockville Battalion of Infantry"
Redesignated 1 December 1897 as the 42nd "Lanark and Renfrew" Battalion of Infantry
Redesignated 8 May 1900 as the 42nd Lanark and Renfrew Regiment
Redesignated 12 March 1920 as The Lanark and Renfrew Regiment
Redesignated 15 July 1927 as The Lanark and Renfrew Scottish Regiment
Redesignated 7 November 1940 as the 2nd (Reserve) Battalion, The Lanark and Renfrew Scottish Regiment
Redesignated 15 September 1944 The Lanark and Renfrew Scottish Regiment (Reserve)
Converted 1 April 1946 to air defence artillery and redesignated as the 59th Light Anti-Aircraft Regiment (Lanark and Renfrew Scottish), RCA
Converted 1 December 1959 to infantry and redesignated as The Lanark and Renfrew Scottish Regiment
Converted 10 November 1992 to artillery air defence and redesignated as the 1st Air Defence Regiment (Lanark and Renfrew Scottish), RCA
Converted 2006 to field artillery, retaining its designation.
Redesignated 26 January 2011 as the 42nd Field Artillery Regiment (Lanark and Renfrew Scottish), RCA

Lineage chart

History
In 1930 the regiment was granted the following battle honours for the Great War. These honours became dormant when the regiment converted to artillery, being replaced by the RCA's honorary distinction .

The regiment did not initially mobilize for the Second World War during the general activation of units beginning in August 1939.

The 1st Battalion, The Lanark and Renfrew Scottish Regiment, CASF was mobilized on 5 March 1942, and served as part of the Army's Atlantic Command in a home defence role. On 15 October 1943, The 1st Battalion, Lanark and Renfrew Scottish Regiment  was disbanded.

In July 1944, the 5th Canadian (Armoured) Division realised that it was short of infantry. The 12th Canadian Infantry Brigade was created out of units already in existence. One unit of the new brigade was the motor battalion of the division, a second was a re-equipped reconnaissance battalion from the 1st Canadian Infantry Division, and a third unit was created from anti-aircraft units, as the Allies had  air superiority. This unit petitioned The Lanark and Renfrew Scottish for permission to use their name and regimental insignia, feeling it was more appropriate for an infantry battalion. Permission was granted, and The Lanark and Renfrew Scottish served in the 12th Brigade until March 1945. After all Canadian forces in Italy were repatriated to the command of First Canadian Army in North-west Europe, the brigade was dissolved, the units therein returned to their former roles, and the Lanark and Renfrew Scottish battalion was returned to its former duties and designation.

Affiliated cadet corps
The regiment is affiliated with two Royal Canadian Army Cadet Corps:
2677 Army Cadet Corps - Pembroke, Ontario
2360 Army Cadet Corps - Arnprior, Ontario

Perpetuations

The Great War
130th Battalion (Lanark and Renfrew), CEF
240th Battalion, CEF

Alliances
 - Royal Regiment of Scotland

Order of precedence

See also 

 Canadian-Scottish regiment
 Military history of Canada
 History of the Canadian Army

Notes

References

 Barnes, RM, The Uniforms and History of the Scottish Regiments, London, Sphere Books Limited, 1972.

External links
 

Field artillery regiments of Canada
Highland & Scottish regiments of Canada
Military units and formations of Ontario
Regiments of Canada in World War II